Monk Little Dog is a series of 3D CGI animated shorts. The series was conceptualized by Kim Sung-jae, of Kim's Licensing, and produced by SAMG Animation. Season 1 of Monk Little Dog premiered on June 16, 2009 on Canal+ in France and ran until June 11, 2010.

In the United Kingdom, the series was broadcast by the CITV Channel, BBC Kids in Canada, and by ABC3 in Australia. In Indonesia, the series was originally aired by Global TV (now GTV) from 2011 until early 2012, but later moved to RTV between 2014 until 2016.

Development
Monk Little Dog was originated from a series of storybooks with clay characters released in 2006, notable books include Monk's Mouth Country Trip; although its development as an animated series goes back to 2005. The difference is this storybook series included one human character while Monk Little Dog does not.

Characters

Main characters
Monk (voiced by David Gasman): An unlucky, but cheerful bull terrier dog. He is the main protagonist of the series.

Secondary characters
Ding : A yellow english cocker spaniel - Monk's non-friend and Kimmy's love interest.
Kimmy (voiced by Sharon Mann): A pink poodle - Monk's crush and Ding's Girlfriend.
Ben (voiced by Matthew Géczy): Monk's best friend who is always asleep.
Sushi: Kimmy's pet cat who hates and somethings loves Monk.
Bubul: A gray pit bull who is Monk's neighbour.

Recurring characters
Bar:
Loo: A brown chow-chow. 
Mi-hie: a superhero and protagonist in the series.
Peace: A naughty and smart lebrel.
San-say: a Japanese dog who is a master of karate and kung-fu.
Sally:  It's Bubul's wife.
Jimmy: An emo dog who is Kimmy's cousin
The Tweets: Are Monk's babysitters. 
Parrot: Monk's parrot who only appears in "Monk and the Birthday Cake".
Monk's parents: The father is identical to he, but with mustache and brown hat. The mother is similar to Kimmy, but mint blue instead of plain pink. 
Poodle's unused name: A gold-amber-yellow poodle report similar to Kimmy, but light gold color.
Ben's dad: It's Ben's dad who appears on Monk's TV.

Episode list

References

2000s French animated television series
2010s French animated television series
2009 French television series debuts
2010 French television series endings
French children's animated comedy television series
South Korean children's animated comedy television series
French computer-animated television series
Animated television series about dogs
Animated television series without speech